Allium grisellum is a plant species endemic to Xinjiang. It is known from one location in a meadow near Toksun Xian, southeast of Urumqi, at an elevation of about 300 m.

Allium grisellum forms clumps of egg-shaped bulbs about 10 mm across. Scapes are up to 20 cm tall, round in cross-section. Leaves narrow, about as long as the scape but only 10–15 mm wide. Umbels have only a few flowers; tepals white with a purple midvein.

References

flavidum
Onions
Flora of China
Flora of Xinjiang
Plants described in 1980